State Route 263 (SR 263) is a primary state highway in the U.S. state of Virginia. Known as Orkney Grade, the state highway runs  from SR 659 in Orkney Springs east to U.S. Route 11 (US 11) in Mount Jackson. SR 263 connects Mount Jackson with a resort area in the mountains of southwestern Shenandoah County.

SR 263 is a Virginia Byway.

Route description

SR 263 begins at the eastern end of Shrine Mont Circle, a loop that is designated SR 659 and serves Shrine Mont, an Episcopal Diocese of Virginia retreat that hosts the annual Shenandoah Valley Music Festival. The state highway heads northeast as a two-lane undivided road from Orkney Springs through a narrow valley between Great North Mountain to the west and Supin Lick Mountain to the east. After passing the Bryce Resort, SR 263 veers southeast and crosses the latter mountain and follows Straight Run through a gap in Timber Ridge to enter the Shenandoah Valley, on the west edge of which the state highway intersects SR 42 (Senedo Road). The state highway passes through Mount Clifton and follows Mill Creek to the town of Mount Jackson, which the highway enters at its underpass of Interstate 81. SR 263 passes under the Chesapeake Western Railway before reaching its eastern terminus at US 11 (Main Street).

Major intersections

References

External links

Virginia Highways Project: VA 263

263
State Route 263
263